Spiny pocket mice may refer to various rodent species of the family Heteromyidae of southern North America and northwestern South America:

 Heteromys sp. in subfamily Heteromyinae
 Spiny pocket mouse, Chaetodipus spinatus, in subfamily Perognathinae